Ruth A. Davis (born May 28, 1943) is an American diplomat. Davis served as the 24th director general of the United States Foreign Service. She is the first woman of color to be appointed as Director General of the Foreign Service and the first African-American Director of the Foreign Service Institute. In 2002, she became a career member of the Senior Foreign Service and a Career Ambassador. She was the Chief of Staff of the Africa Bureau of the U.S. Department of State.

Early life
Born May 28, 1943 in Phoenix, Arizona,  but raised primarily in the southern United States, she grew up in the South and recalls the separation of whites and blacks. She remembers family vacations with her parents in which many restaurants and public services were off limits to African Americans. Davis graduated magna cum laude from Spelman College in and received her Master's Degree from the University of California at Berkeley.  As a Merrill Scholar at Spelman, Davis studied abroad in Europe and the Middle East.

Diplomat and ambassador
In 2001, Davis was appointed by President George W. Bush to the post of Director General of the Foreign Service.  Prior to assuming this position, Davis served as of the Foreign Service Institute from 1977 to 2001.

Davis has also served as the Principal Deputy Director Assistant Secretary for Consular Affairs (1995–1997), as Consul General in Spain and was the U.S. Ambassador to Benin from 1992 to 1995.  She also served as Distinguished Advisor at the Ralph Bunche International Affairs Center at Howard University from 2003 until 2005.
Davis joined the Foreign Service in 1969 as Consular Officer in Zaire and between 1971 until 1980 she went on to serve in consular affairs in Nairobi, Kenya, Tokyo, Japan and Naples, Italy.  She returned to the United States as a Pearson Fellow in Washington, DC.

Davis is credited for improving the District's involvement in the international, economic and diplomatic arenas.  She is also credited for her contributions to the 1992 Barcelona Olympic Games and to Atlanta's successful bid for the 1996 Olympics.

Described as a "Diplomatic Pioneer", Davis has worked diligently to increase diversity among the ranks of the ranks of the international diplomatic corps. During her tenure she has been successful in attracting more diverse people into the Foreign Service.

In 2016 Ruth A. Davis was presented the Lifetime Contributions to American Diplomacy Award by the American Foreign Service Association.

Awards
 Honorary Doctor of Laws Spelman College (1998)
 U.S. State Department Arnold L. Raphel Memorial Award (1999)
 U.S. State Department Superior Honor Award (1999)
 Presidential Distinguished Service Award (President Bill Clinton) (1999)
 Honorary Doctor of Laws Middlebury College (2000)
 Presidential Distinguished Service Award (President George W. Bush) (2002)
 U.S. Secretary of State Achievement Award (2003)
 U.S. State Department Equal Employment Opportunity Award (2005)

References

External links
Foreign Service Journal article on her Lifetime Contributions to American Diplomacy Award. 
 

1943 births
Living people
University of California, Berkeley alumni
United States Career Ambassadors
Spelman College alumni
African-American women in politics
African-American diplomats
American women ambassadors
Ambassadors of the United States to Benin
United States Foreign Service personnel
Directors General of the United States Foreign Service
Recipients of the President's Award for Distinguished Federal Civilian Service